Fermanagh and Tyrone was a county constituency of the Parliament of Northern Ireland from 1921 to 1929. It returned eight MPs, using proportional representation by means of the single transferable vote.

Boundaries
Fermanagh and Tyrone was created by the Government of Ireland Act 1920 and consisted of the entirety of County Fermanagh and County Tyrone. The House of Commons (Method of Voting and Redistribution of Seats) Act (Northern Ireland) 1929 divided the constituency into eight constituencies elected under first past the post: East Tyrone, Enniskillen, Lisnaskea, Mid Tyrone, North Tyrone, South Fermanagh, South Tyrone and West Tyrone.

Second Dáil
In May 1921, Dáil Éireann, the parliament of the self-declared Irish Republic run by Sinn Féin, passed a resolution declaring that elections to the House of Commons of Northern Ireland and the House of Commons of Southern Ireland would be used as the election for the Second Dáil. All those elected were on the roll of the Second Dáil, but only three of the 8 MPs elected for Fermanagh and Tyrone also sat as TDs in Dáil Éireann: Arthur Griffith and Seán Milroy, both of whom were also elected for Clare, and Seán O'Mahony. O'Mahony was the only Sinn Féin TD in the Second Dáil who represented only a constituency in Northern Ireland.

Politics
Fermanagh and Tyrone had a slight Nationalist majority, but this was fairly evenly balanced with a Unionist minority. In both elections, four Unionists were elected, alongside three Sinn Féin members and one Nationalist in 1921, and four Nationalists in 1925.

Members of Parliament

Election results

Griffith died on 12 August 1922; his seat remained vacant at dissolution.
Coote died on 14 December 1924; his seat remained vacant at dissolution.

References

Northern Ireland Parliament constituencies established in 1921
Northern Ireland Parliament constituencies disestablished in 1929
Constituencies of the Northern Ireland Parliament
Historic constituencies in County Fermanagh
Historic constituencies in County Tyrone
Dáil constituencies in Northern Ireland (historic)